Jack Creek is a stream in the U.S. state of South Dakota.

Jack Creek derives its name from the nickname ("Jack") of the gun a cowboy lost near the creek.

See also
List of rivers of South Dakota

References

Rivers of Harding County, South Dakota
Rivers of South Dakota